The 2011–12 season was the 55th season in RK Zamet’s history. It is their 4th successive season in the Dukat Premier League, and 34th successive top tier season.

First team squad

Goalkeeper
 1  Marin Đurica
 12  Ivan Stevanović
 16  Dino Slavić

Wingers
RW
 6  Dario Černeka
 15  Igor Montanari - Knez
LW
 2  Damir Vučko 
 4  Mateo Hrvatin

Line players
 3  Tomislav Karaula
 7  Milan Uzelac (captain)
 10  Teo Čorić
 10  Marko Kačanić
 20  Patrick Čuturić

Back players
LB
 8  Bojan Lončarić
 14  Ivan Lukačić
 17  Igor Vujić
CB
 5  Luka Mrakovčić
 9  Ivan Ćosić
 18  Matija Golik
 19  Marin Sakić
RB
 11  Marin Kružić
 13  Luka Kovačević

Source: rukometstat.com
Source: SportCom.hr

Technical staff
  President: Zlatko Kolić
  Vice-president: Željko Jovanović (until March 3)
  Sports director: Aleksandar Čupić 
  Head Coach: Alen Kurbanović 
  Assistant Coach: Marin Mišković
  Goalkeeper Coach: Igor Dokmanović
  Fitness Coach: Branimir Maričević
  Tehniko: Williams Černeka

Competitions

Overall

Dukat Premier League

League table

Source: rukometstat.com
Source: SportCom.hr

Matches

Source: rukometstat.com
Source: SportCom.hr

Europe play-offs

Table

Matches

Source: rukometstat.com
Source: SportCom.hr

Croatian Cup

PGŽ Cup - Qualifiers

Source: rukometstat.com
Source: SportCom.hr

Matches

Source: rukometstat.com
Source: SportCom.hr

Friendlies

Source: SportCom.hr

Transfers

In

Out

References

RK Zamet seasons